Richard Fraser (born Richard Mackie Simpson; 15 March 1913 – 19 January 1972) was a Scottish film, television, and stage actor. He is perhaps best known for his role in the 1945 film The Picture of Dorian Gray.

Early life
After graduating from Sedbergh School as Richard Mackie Simpson, Richard's mother divorced and his name was shortened to Richard Mackie. After attending Cambridge University, Richard Mackie studied acting at the Royal Academy of Dramatic Art. Having spent time as a London stage actor, Richard emigrated to the US and in New York married Louise Christine Sheldon, the couple then moved to Hollywood before the Second World War. Discovering that there was already a Richard Mackie acting in the US he adopted the stage name Richard Fraser. He then signed a contract with 20th Century Fox and appeared in numerous films.

Career
His American film career reached its peak with his performance as James Vane, the vengeful brother of Sibyl Vane in the film The Picture of Dorian Gray. Richard retired from acting in 1949, returning to Britain in 1961 with his then-wife, US actress Ann Gillis, spending his most of his last decade working for the BBC in export sales.

Selected filmography

 The Ghost Goes West (1935) as Son of MacLaggen (uncredited)
 Man Hunt (1941) as Navigator (uncredited)
 A Yank in the R.A.F. (1941) as Thorndyke
 How Green Was My Valley (1941) as Davy Morgan
 Joan of Paris (1942) as Geoffrey
 Eagle Squadron (1942) as Lt. Jefferys
 Busses Roar (1942) as Dick Remick
 Desperate Journey (1942) as Squadron Leader Clark
 The Gorilla Man (1943) as Lieutenant Walter Sibley
 Truck Busters (1943) as Limey
 Edge of Darkness (1943) as Pastor Aalesen
 Thumbs Up (1943) as Douglas Heath
 Holy Matrimony (1943) as John Leek (uncredited)
 Ladies Courageous (1944) as Col. Andy Brennan
 The Picture of Dorian Gray (1945) as James Vane
 The Fatal Witness (1945) as Inspector William 'Bill' Trent
 Scotland Yard Investigator (1945) as Inspector Cartwright
 Shadow of Terror (1945) as Jim, aka Howard Norton
 White Pongo (1945) as Geoffrey Bishop
 The Tiger Woman (1945) as Stephen Mason
 The Undercover Woman (1946) as Gregory Vixon
 Bedlam (1946) as Hannay
 Blonde for a Day (1946) as Dillingham 'Dilly' Smith
 Cloak and Dagger (1946) as British Submarine Skipper (uncredited)
 The Private Affairs of Bel Ami (1947) as Philippe de Cantel
 Blackmail (1947) as Antoine le Blanc
 The Lone Wolf in London (1947) as David Woolerton
 Raw Deal (1948) as Fields
 Rogues' Regiment (1948) as Rycroft
 The Cobra Strikes (1948) as Michael Kent
 Alaska Patrol (1949) as Operative Farrell (as Dick Fraser)
 The Red Danube (1949) as Transport Pilot (uncredited)

References

External links

 

1913 births
1972 deaths
Scottish male stage actors
Scottish male film actors
Male actors from Edinburgh
20th-century Scottish male actors
British expatriate male actors in the United States